Kondapadumati is the name of a medieval dynasty that resided in the modern day state of Andhra Pradesh, India.  They held the Kondapadumati or Sallapaschalya Vishaya, the country to the west of the Kondavidu range of hills, corresponding to the eastern portion of Sattenapalla Talug (of Guntur District) for one and a half centuries.  They had their capital at Nadendla not far from Tsandavole, the Velanadu capital.  They started off as subordinates to the Chalukya Cholas.  The Kondapadumatis secured an important military success over the Kalinga and the Telugu Chodas and were allied to the Velanadu Chodas by marriages.  A branch of the Kondapadumatis are the Kotas.

Origin
They trace their genealogy to Kubjavishnu of the Chalukya dynasty and then pass on to Buddhavarman, the first ancestor of the dynasty. The Chebrole inscription says that Brahma was born from the navel lotus of Vishnu, from Vishnu born Buddhavarman.  According to other inscriptions Buddhavarman served valiantly at the side of Kubjavishnu and received from him the country to the west of the hill which contained seventy three villages along with royal emblems.  As Kubjavishnu founder of the Chalukyas of Vengi flourished from 615-633 A.D., his subordinate Buddhavarman must have flourished in this period. The Kondapadamatis were semi-independent for most of their reign and had their own coinage.

References

Dynasties of India
History of Andhra Pradesh